The 1976 UNLV Rebels football team was an American football team that represented the University of Nevada, Las Vegas as an independent during the 1976 NCAA Division II football season. In their first year under head coach Tony Knap, the team compiled a 9–3 record.

Hired in late January, Knap was previously the head coach at Division II Boise State (1968–75) and Division I Utah State (1963–66).

Schedule

References

UNLV
UNLV Rebels football seasons
UNLV Rebels football